Poonam Yadav (born 24 August 1991) is an Indian cricketer who plays for the national women's cricket team as a leg-spin bowler. She made her debut in International cricket on 5 April 2013 in a Women's Twenty20 International (WT20I) match against Bangladesh. Yadav's debut in Test Series on 16 November 2014 against South Africa and her ODI debut was on 12 April 2013 against Bangladesh.

Early life
Yadav was born on 24 August 1991 in Mainpuri, Uttar Pradesh, India. Her father's name is Raghuveer Singh Yadav, who is a retired army officer. Her mother's name is Munna Devi and she is a homemaker.

To pursue her career, Yadav had to shift to Agra from Mainpuri. There she trained at the Eklavya Sports Stadium. Three years later, Yadav almost quit cricket but was motivated by her father to continue further.

International career

Yadav was part of the Indian team to reach the final of the 2017 Women's Cricket World Cup where the team lost to England by nine runs. In June 2018, she entered the top five of the women's T20I rankings and came in third on the list.  In October 2018, she was named in India's squad for the 2018 ICC Women's World Twenty20 tournament in the West Indies. Ahead of the tournament, she was named as one of the players to watch. She was the joint-leading wicket-taker for India in the tournament, with eight dismissals in five matches. She became India's highest wicket-taker in Twenty20 Internationals in September 2018 with 57 wickets from 39 T20Is. She went past Jhulan Goswami's tally of 56 in the first T20I against Sri Lanka. She is also the only front-line bowler who has been in every T20 match for India in 2018.

In January 2020, she was named in India's squad for the 2020 ICC Women's T20 World Cup in Australia. India reached the final but lost to the hosts, with Yadav taking 1-30 (her solitary wicket being that of Rachael Haynes) and scoring 1 run before being last out to confirm Australia's victory. Her best bowling performance came in the opening game against the eventual champions Australia, where she wreaked havoc with figures of 4-0-19-4

In May 2021, she was named in India's Test squad for their one-off match against the England women's cricket team. In January 2022, she was named in India's team for the 2022 Women's Cricket World Cup in New Zealand.

T20 Leagues
Poonam played for Supernovas in the Women's T20 Challenge in 2019 and 2022. She played for Brisbane Heat in the 2021–22 Women's Big Bash League.

References

External links
 

1991 births
Living people
Sportspeople from Agra
India women Test cricketers
India women One Day International cricketers
India women Twenty20 International cricketers
Cricketers from Uttar Pradesh
Uttar Pradesh women cricketers
Central Zone women cricketers
Railways women cricketers
IPL Trailblazers cricketers
IPL Supernovas cricketers
Delhi Capitals (WPL) cricketers
Brisbane Heat (WBBL) cricketers
Recipients of the Arjuna Award